Tarur-I is a village in Palakkad district in the state of Kerala, India. It forms a part of Tarur gram panchayat, together with Tarur-II.

Demographics
 India census, Tarur-I had a population of 15,720 with 7,439 males and 8,281 females.

References

Villages in Palakkad district